The Golan Heights are a rocky plateau in Western Asia that was captured by Israel from Syria in the 1967 Six-Day War. The international community recognizes the Golan Heights to be official Syrian territory and widely rejects Israeli military occupation. Following the war, Syria dismissed any negotiations with Israel as part of the Khartoum Resolution.

The Golan was under military administration until the Knesset passed the Golan Heights Law in 1981, which applied Israeli law to the territory; a move that has been described as an annexation. In response, the United Nations Security Council unanimously passed UNSC Resolution 497 which condemned the Israeli actions to change the status of the territory declaring them "null and void and without international legal effect", and that the Golan remained an occupied territory. In 2019, the United States became the only state to recognize the Golan Heights as Israeli sovereign territory, while the rest of the international community continues to consider the territory Syrian held under Israeli military occupation.

British and French Mandates
Following World War I, portions of the former territory of the Ottoman Empire was split into several League of Nations mandates under the control of one of the victorious Allied countries of the war. The British Mandate for Palestine and the French Mandate for Syria were two such mandates, with the border finalized between the two in the Paulet–Newcombe Agreement. The border, drawn in 1923, was the first international border between Syria and Palestine and to date is the last, with the remaining boundaries since then having been a result of armistice agreements. The boundary placed the entirety of the Sea of Galilee, along with a ten meter wide strip on the eastern shore, within the British Mandate. The French Mandate ended in 1946 with the independence of the Republic of Syria, and Syria demanded changes to the border to allow for greater access to fresh water sources, demands the British refused on the basis that the border had been submitted and approved to the League of Nations and Britain thus considered the matter closed.

Post-mandate period
The 1948 Arab–Israeli War, which followed Israel's declaration of independence, resulted in the newly formed state of Israel in control over roughly 77% of what had been the territory of the British Mandate. Syria had however advanced to the eastern shoreline of the Sea of Galilee, where the border as delineated by the British and the French was ten meters east of the shoreline. In the armistice negotiations that followed the declaration of a ceasefire, that ten meter strip was included in a demilitarized zone as Israel had argued for.

Six-Day War and aftermath
In the 1967 Six-Day War, Israel occupied the Syrian Golan. Following the war, the United Nations Security Council passed Resolution 242, which called on Israel to withdraw from territories occupied in the war in exchange for the termination of all states of belligerency and recognition of Israel as a sovereign state by the Arab states. The 1973 Arab-Israeli War saw further territorial gains by Israel, though Israel agreed to return to the 1967 ceasefire line in the 1974 disengagement agreement between Israel and Syria. Syria has continued to insist on the return of the Golan in any negotiated peace agreement between the two countries.

Golan Heights Law 
On 14 December 1981 the Israeli Knesset passed the Golan Heights Law. While the law did not use the term annexation, it was considered to be an annexation by the Israeli opposition and international community.

The action was condemned internationally, and in response the United Nations Security Council passed United Nations Security Council Resolution 497 declaring the law "null and void and without international legal effect" and that the Fourth Geneva Convention continued to apply to the Golan as an occupied territory.

International views
The international community widely considers the Golan to be Syrian territory held under Israeli occupation. A number of states recognize the Israeli occupation as being legitimate under the United Nations Charter on a self-defense basis, but do not consider those concerns to allow for the annexation of territory seized by force. 

In March 2019, the United States, which previously considered the Golan Heights to be occupied, became the first country to recognize Israeli sovereignty over the territory it has held since 1967. The rest of the international community continues to view the territory as Syrian, held under Israeli occupation.  The European Union members of the United Nations Security Council issued a joint statement condemning the US announcement and the UN Secretary-General António Guterres issued a statement saying that the status of the Golan Heights had not changed. The Arab League denounced the US move, declaring that  "Trump's recognition does not change the area's status."

See also 
 Borders of Israel
 Israeli-occupied territories
 Israel–Syria relations

References

Golan Heights